Casanova Sin Amor (Casanova Without Love) is a Colombian telenovela that was to be produced by the United States-based television network Telemundo and RTI Colombia. The production has been canceled as director Miguel Varoni has left the production to direct another Telemundo Studios Colombia's telenovela, La Diosa Coronada .

The story revolves around Juan Pablo, the owner of a successful television company that searches for a real love.

Cast

References

Unaired television pilots
Television pilots not picked up as a series
American television series based on telenovelas
Colombian telenovelas
RTI Producciones telenovelas
Telemundo telenovelas
Television series by Universal Television